The Lighthorsemen is a 1987 Australian war film about the men of a World War I light horse unit involved in Sinai and Palestine campaign's 1917 Battle of Beersheeba.  The film is based on a true story and most of the characters in the film were based on real people. (Elyne Mitchell wrote the novelization based on the screenplay.)

It follows in the wake of other Australian New Wave war films such as Breaker Morant (1980), Gallipoli (1981), and the 5-part TV series Anzacs (1985).  Recurring themes of these films include the Australian identity, such as mateship and larrikinism, the loss of innocence in war, and also the continued coming of age of the Australian nation and its soldiers (the ANZAC spirit).

The film was directed by Simon Wincer, and several pieces of footage from the climactic scenes were re-used in the episode "Palestine, October 1917" of the television series The Young Indiana Jones Chronicles.  This episode, which aired in 1993, likewise focuses on the Battle of Beersheeba, and was also directed by Wincer.

Plot
The film follows four Australian cavalrymen (Frank, Scotty, Chiller, and Tas) in Palestine in 1917, part of the 4th Light Horse Brigade of the British and Commonwealth forces. When Frank is wounded and later dies, he is replaced by Dave. Dave finds himself unable to fire his weapon in combat and is transferred to the Medical Corps, where he will not need to carry a weapon, but where he will still be exposed to the fighting.

The British plan the capture of Beersheba.  During an attack by Turkish cavalry, Major Richard Meinertzhagen deliberately leaves behind documents indicating that the attack on Beersheba will only be a diversion. The Australians leave for Beersheba, with limited water and supplies. They bombard the town and the 4,000 Turkish-German defenders prepare for an assault. However, the German military advisor, Reichert, believes it is a diversionary attack and advises the Turkish commander he does not need reinforcements. With time running out and water in short supply, the British command suspect any attack upon Beersheba will probably fail. However, the Australian commanders ask the British to send in the Australian Light Horse—the British consent to what they think is a suicide mission.

On 31 October, the 4th and 12th Light Horse Regiments are ordered to attack the Turks. Dave and the rest of the medical detachment prepare for casualties and are ordered in behind the Light Horse. The Turks report the Australian mounted soldiers lining up to charge, however the officer in charge orders the Turks not to open fire until they dismount, having recognized that they are light horse who ride for mobility but are not trained or equipped as true cavalry.  The Australians begin advancing on the Turkish positions, gradually speeding up to a charge. The Turks realise too late that the soldiers are not dismounting and open fire. Artillery fire is sporadic and of limited effect and the attack so fast the Turkish infantry forget to adjust the sights on their rifles as the Light Horse get closer, eventually firing straight over the Australians' heads.

During the charge, Tas is killed by an artillery shell. The remaining Australians make it "under the guns" (advancing faster than the artillery can correct its aim for the reduced range) and reach the Turkish trenches. The Australians subsequently capture the first line of Turkish defences. Scotty and a few others take control of the guns. Chiller is wounded in the trench fight. Dave is struck by a grenade and is seriously wounded while protecting Chiller. Scotty continues to fight on into the town. When most of the remaining Turkish soldiers surrender, Reichert tries to destroy the wells, but is captured by Scotty. Overall, the attack was a success and the Australians miraculously suffered only 31 dead and 36 wounded.
This effectively opened the 'door' and allowed for the subsequent capture of Jerusalem and the rest of the country. General Allenby, in deference to the Holy City, walked into the city, coming as a liberator not a conqueror.

Cast

 Peter Phelps as Dave Mitchell
 Shane Briant as Captain Reichert
 Ralph Cotterill as General Friedrich Kress von Kressenstein
 Bill Kerr as Lieutenant-General Sir Harry Chauvel
 Grant Piro as Charlie
 Tony Bonner as Lieutenant-Colonel Murray Bourchier
 Serge Lazareff as Major George Rankin
 Gary Sweet as Frank
 John Walton as Tas
 Tim McKenzie as Chiller
 Jon Blake as Trooper Scotty Bolton
 Patrick Frost as Sergeant Ted Seager
 Adrian Wright as Lawson
 Sigrid Thornton as Anne
 Anthony Andrews as Major Richard Meinertzhagen
 Anthony Hawkins as General Sir Edmund Allenby
 Gerard Kennedy as Colonel Ismet Bey
 Jon Sidney as Brigadier-General William Grant
 Graham Dow as Major-General Henry Hodgson
 James Wright as Brigadier-General Percy FitzGerald
 Steve Bastoni as Turkish Demolition Soldier

Production
The script was written by Ian Jones, who had long been interested in the Australian Light Horse ever since they featured in an episode of Matlock Police in 1971. He visited Beersheba in 1979 and had carefully researched the period. Simon Wincer came on board as director and he succeeded in helping secure a $6 million pre sale to RKO. Antony I. Ginnane's Film and General Holdings Company succeeded in raising the rest of the money. Simon Wincer later claimed that Ginanne, Ian Jones and himself had to put in their own money at some stage when the film looked like falling over. Well known Australian cinematographer Dean Semler was also brought in.

Despite being set in Palestine and Egypt, the film was shot entirely on location in Victoria and Hawker, South Australia. After the final day of filming had wrapped on 1 December 1986, actor Jon Blake was injured in a car accident near Nectar Brook, South Australia. He suffered permanent paralysis and brain damage.

The musical score was composed by Mario Millo. The original soundtrack recording was produced for compact disc release courtesy of Antony I Ginnane by Philip Powers and Mario Millo for Australian distribution in Australia by 1M1 Records and as a coupling with Shame on LP in the US. The movie was re-cut to a shorter length for the US release, which Wincer thought made the second half better, although he did not like the opening as much.

Historical inaccuracies
The German Empire flag on General Kressenstein's car features a band of red above a band of white, above a band of black; in reality, the colours were ordered black-white-red.

Reception
The film received mixed reviews from critics. Rotten Tomatoes gives it a 67% approval rating based on 6 reviews.

Roger Ebert, reflecting other critics' opinions, stated that "I was disoriented almost all the way through the movie." but that in the climax, "I haven't seen a better action scene with horses since "Ben Hur"." An unfavourable review came from The New York Times, who stated the film was "a sort of pacifist-aggressive war adventure" and that "None of the performances are really bad, but none are very good". The Washington Post also gave the film a negative review, described it as "Mostly ... equine cinematography, a four-legged coffeetable movie about the Australian cavalry.".

The film grossed  in Australia after its release in 1987 which is equivalent to 8.25 million in 2009 dollars. It was also released in Canada, Sweden, the United Kingdom, and the United States in 1988. It was considered a commercial disappointment, yet Wincer claims its pre-sales and television sales were about $6 million or 60% of the budget. The film won an AFI award in 1988 for Best Original Music Score and another for Best Achievement in Sound. It was also nominated for Best Achievement in Cinematography. The Lighthorsemen is included in the Australian Film Commission's Top Australian films at the Australian box office list at number 83.

See also
 Australian New Wave
 Breaker Morant
 Cinema of Australia
 Forty Thousand Horsemen
 Gallipoli

References

External links
 
 
 The Lighthorsemen at the National Film and Sound Archive
 Curator's Notes at Australian Screen

1987 films
1980s war films
1980s historical films
Australian films based on actual events
Australian epic films
Australian war films
Australian historical films
World War I films set in the Middle East
World War I films based on actual events
Australian World War I films
Films set in 1917
Films set in Palestine (region)
Films shot in Flinders Ranges
Australian Light Horse
Films directed by Simon Wincer
Films set in the Ottoman Empire
1980s English-language films